Villoslada is a municipality located in the province of Segovia in Castilla y Leon, Spain.

Context
Villoslada is the head of the "Sexmo of the Trinity" in the "Commonwealth and Land of Segovia", which is also known as "Villoslada of the Trinity". It includes, in addition to the place of its name, the hamlet of San Miguel and the outback of Elmore (or Ermoro). It belongs to the party of judicial Santa Maria la Real de Nieva, to which was united as a dependent district for a few years until the recognition of their autonomy as a minor local entity.

Local economy
Villoslada is basically a grain producer, as well as a producer of sunflowers and some other minor crops. In the past it bred sheep, cattle and pigs.

Festivals
Villoslada celebrates the festival of its patron saint, San Miguel, the second weekend in May, although the parish patron is San Nicolas de Bari (celebrated December 6). It also holds a San Roque festival on August 16.

Heritage
Among its monuments are the Chapel of San Miguel de Párraces, a Romanesque church built in the 12th and 13th centuries, catalogued as a national monument, it holds an interesting Romanesque Christ sculpture from the same period known as "Holy Christ". Also there are the Parish Church of St. Nicholas and the remains of an ancient shrine known as The Holy Land.

Municipalities in the Province of Segovia